Matt Simpson is an American politician. A Republican, he is currently serving in the New York State Assembly, representing the 114th district, which encompasses all of Essex and Warren counties, and portions of Saratoga and Washington counties. He assumed office on January 6, 2021.

Early life, education, and career 
Simpson grew up in Bolton, New York. His father was a teacher and his mother was a nurse at Glens Falls Hospital. He graduated from Hoosic Valley High School in 1985, and  started his own dry wall company, working as a business owner for more than 30 years.

Political career 
Simpson served on the Horicon, New York Town Board for two years before being running unopposed and being elected supervisor of the town. He also served as president of the Adirondack Association of Towns and Villages. In December 2019, Simpson announced his intentions to run for the 114th Assembly District upon the incumbent, Dan Stec, announcing his desire to represent the 45th district of the New York State Senate.  Simpson was elected to the assembly in 2020, defeating Democratic challenger Claudia Braymer and Serve America Movement candidate Evelyn Wood, earning 56.7% of the vote. Upon being elected to the state assembly, he retired his town supervisor seat on December 31, 2020.

References 

People from New York (state)
Republican Party members of the New York State Assembly
Living people
21st-century American politicians
1967 births